Just Dance 2022 is a 2021 dance rhythm game developed and published by Ubisoft. It was unveiled on June 12, 2021, during the Ubisoft Forward E3 web presentation as the thirteenth main installment of the series, and was released on November 4, 2021, for Nintendo Switch, PlayStation 4, PlayStation 5, Xbox One, Xbox Series X/S, and Stadia. This is the final installment released for PlayStation 4, Xbox One and Stadia (before its closure on January 18, 2023), the final installment to support PlayStation Move and camera devices and the last known game overall to support Kinect.

Gameplay

As with the previous installments of the franchise, players must mimic the on-screen dancer's choreography to a chosen song using either motion controllers (excluding the ninth generation consoles and Stadia) or the game's associated smartphone app. The Stadia version also allows the use of a gamepad and a keyboard for menu navigation.

Its user interface and features are largely identical to those of Just Dance 2019, Just Dance 2020 and Just Dance 2021, with the mechanics being the same as 2021.

Soundtrack
The following songs appear on Just Dance 2022:

Kids Mode
The following songs appear on the Kids Mode of the game, note that the following were previously featured on the Kids Mode of previous Just Dance games:

Just Dance Unlimited
Just Dance Unlimited continues to be offered on 2022 for eighth- and ninth-generation consoles and Stadia, featuring a streaming library of new and existing songs.

Songs exclusive to Just Dance Unlimited include:

References

External links

Dance video games
2021 video games
Fitness games
Just Dance (video game series)
Music video games
Kinect games
PlayStation 4 games
PlayStation 5 games
PlayStation Move-compatible games
Stadia games
Nintendo Switch games
Ubisoft games
Video games developed in France
Xbox One games
Xbox Series X and Series S games